Fata Morgana (also known as Left-Handed Fate) is a 1965 Spanish drama film directed by veteran filmmaker Vicente Aranda and distributed in America by Troma Entertainment.  It grossed 1,882,000 ESP in the box office with 40,053 in attendance.

Cast 
 Teresa Gimpera - Gim
 Marianne Benet - Miriam 
 Marcos Martí - J.J.
 Antonio Ferrandis - El Profesor
 Alberto Dalbés - Álvaro 
 Antonio Casas - Luis

External links

1965 films
1960s Spanish-language films
Spanish independent films
Troma Entertainment films
Films directed by Vicente Aranda
1965 independent films
1960s Spanish films